August Reinhold Hedberg (7 January 1862, Petalax - 28 February 1922) was a Finnish Lutheran clergyman and politician. He was a member of the Parliament of Finland from 1907 to 1909 and again from 1917 to 1919, representing the Swedish People's Party of Finland (SFP). He was the son of Fredrik Gabriel Hedberg and the younger brother of John Hedberg.

References

1862 births
1922 deaths
People from Malax
People from Vaasa Province (Grand Duchy of Finland)
19th-century Finnish Lutheran clergy
Swedish People's Party of Finland politicians
Members of the Parliament of Finland (1907–08)
Members of the Parliament of Finland (1908–09)
Members of the Parliament of Finland (1917–19)
People of the Finnish Civil War (White side)
University of Helsinki alumni
20th-century Finnish Lutheran clergy